The 1979 Army Cadets football team represented the United States Military Academy during the 1979 NCAA Division I-A football season. Led by Lou Saban in his first and only season as head coach, Army finished the season with a record of 2–8–1.

Schedule

Personnel

Season summary

at Penn State

vs. Navy

References

Army
Army Black Knights football seasons
Army Cadets football